Tren Francés (Spanish for "French Train") was the name of the flagship Cuban InterCity service between Havana and Santiago. Owned by Ferrocarriles de Cuba, it was operated by SNCF ex-Trans Europ Express (TEE) , originally used in Europe between Paris and Amsterdam, on the Étoile du Nord service and  used in France between Paris and Nice on Le Mistral. Both of these two French flagship trains were replaced by TGV and Thalys from 1982 (Mistral) to 1996 (Étoile du Nord). The Tren Francés was formed by 12 coaches and a Chinese-built diesel locomotive.

Over the years, the coaches deteriorated. In 2019, the service was replaced by a new service using Chinese-built coaches.

Overview
The Tren Francés (also spelled El Francés or Especial), named after the country of origin of the coaches (France), donated by SNCF to FFCC in 2001, was the fastest long-distance service in Cuba. It had the most modern coaches and was divided into two classes named primera especial (1st) and primera (nominally 1st, identifiable as 2nd). There were no sleeping cars, couchettes or car-carrying wagons.

Route
Travelling along the Havana-Santiago line, the Tren Francés made intermediate stops only at the main cities of Santa Clara and Camagüey. Other important cities traversed along the route were Matanzas, Colón, Ciego de Ávila, Florida, and Las Tunas. Some junction stations to nearby provincial capitals were served at Cabaiguán (for Sancti Spíritus) and Cacocum (for Holguín).

Havana – Santiago (eastbound)

Santiago – Havana (westbound)

See also
Ferrocarriles de Cuba
Lists of named passenger trains

References

External links

 "A train travel from Santiago de Cuba to Havana" (Havana Times)

Named passenger trains of Cuba
Night trains
2001 establishments in Cuba